The first season of Street Dance of China (SDC1; simplified Chinese: 这！就是街舞 第一季; traditional Chinese: 這！就是街舞 第一季; pinyin: Zhè! Jiùshì jiēwǔ dì yī jì) premiered on Youku at 20:00 every Saturday from February 24, 2018, and ended on May 13, 2018. It has a total of 12 episodes featuring the star captains Yi Yang Qianxi, Luo Zhixiang, Han Geng, and Huang Zitao. Through the mode of "star mentor + professional dancer reality show", the program adopts individual selection and team combat performances. Under the leadership of four captains, four teams are formed to conduct group dance battles between teams, and finally the overall champion will be selected. Han Yu, a member of Yi Yang Qianxi team, won the championship.

Program Stages

Stage 1: Audition 
The four captains incarnated as "Street Fighters" and guarded their respective streets. The dancers needed to choose one of them for street dance demonstrations. Only with the approval of the captains can they successfully advance. Each street has 25 promotion places.

Stage 2: 100 to 49 
The contestants need to perform their own works in the order of drawing lots. The three captains except the audition captain will vote: 3 votes will be directly promoted, and 1 vote or 0 votes will be eliminated directly. Get 2 votes to enter the pending area; if no one calls out (not accepting the challenge), you will advance. Otherwise, the challenger needs to perform freestyle (improvisation) according to the music of the performer. The result of the game is voted by the 4 captains: the one with the most votes wins, and the tie Tickets are one more (extra round) until the winner is determined; if the challenger fails, they will lose the opportunity to solo (solo) and be eliminated directly. way to select a challenger.

Stage 3: 49 to 44 
The top 49 players scrambled and regrouped into 8 groups, choreographed a dance within 24 hours, and competed in pairs. The music and the competition group were determined by drawing lots. After the 24-hour choreography, 8 groups of contestants will perform a dance show in pairs. The winner will be determined by the four captains. All members of the winner group will advance. link. After all the eight groups of competitions are over, all the undetermined players will start the "tie-breaker" battle: the order of appearance is determined by turning the bottle, and a 1-on-1 dance will be performed within the specified time. The captain will vote to determine the winner. Lord, the loser enters the end of the line and waits for a fight. The top three points in the specified time will advance to the top 44, but if someone beats all the fighting players in a row, they will advance directly.

Stage 4: The Teams Are Divided Into Groups (44 into 40) 
The robbery battle adopts the method of two-way selection. The room of four dancers is opened at a time. Each captain can chat with the four, but only one of the four can be selected. A favorite player hangs the towel at the door of the room where the player is. After the four captains have been selected, the players will conduct inverse elections. If the two sides choose each other, they will be paired to join the team, otherwise the players will enter the waiting area.

Stage 5: The Team Competes for Hegemony 
40 into 28: The four teams will face each other in two groups, and each group will use the same music for three rounds: after each round, the audience will vote, and the winner will get one point. After the three rounds of competition, the team with three points is safe, otherwise, for each point missing, the captain will choose two players from his team to be eliminated.

28 into 21: Each team divides itself into two groups, and arranges troops according to the captain to fight against other teams. After every two teams compete, the audience votes, all the winners will advance, and the losers will immediately eliminate two performers.

Stage 6: The Strong Breakout Competition (21 to 12) 
The pas de deux works are displayed. Two players from the same team work together to complete a dance work. The captain will choose one of the two, and one person will be directly promoted. At the same time, the on-site jury will vote for each work. After the ten sets of works are finished, the performers of the two sets of works with the highest votes will be promoted.

Stage 7: Semi-finals (12 into 7) 
The top 12 players decided to perform one of the six themes of "Gold, Wood, Water, Fire, Earth, This is Hip-hop" by drawing lots, and the cooperation performance is no longer limited For the contestants, they are paired with classical dancers, folk dancers, ballet dancers, national standard dancers, modern dancers, and hip-hop dancers. Each dancer who advances to the semi-finals will not only perform the same theme, but also partner with the same professional dancer from other dance styles. After the top 6 places were determined by the competition, the battle for points was started again to compete for the last place to advance to the finals. The 6 losers will decide the order of appearance by turning the bottle, and they will have a 1-on-1 dance within the specified time. The player with the highest points within the specified time will directly advance to the finals, but if someone beats all the fighting players in a row, they will advance directly.

Stage 8: The Finals 
The finals are divided into four rounds, and the rules for each round are completely different. They are the opening show qualifying match, the guests help dance, the team fight dance, and the limit fight dance.

Production 
In order to bring hip-hop back to the streets, the program team specially built a real-life stage to integrate with the characteristic streets.

The program team reproduced four streets representing different regional cultures one by one: Shanghai Shikumen Street full of clothes drying bamboo poles and clothes, old Beijing China Red Street with lantern red walls and courtyard gates, Guangzhou with heavy warehouses and iron gates The arcade street, the extreme future street with dilapidated brick walls, backboard racks and skateboard slides, four streets of 8m x 19m converge in an X-shape towards the center. The main stage is a combination of sci-fi and Chinese elements, and various styles are mixed and matched, representing the imagination of the future city.

Episodes and Results

Episode 1 (February 24, 2018) 
The four captains opened the hip-hop show, and they crossed over to dance to their full potential, and launched a "space battle" on their own exclusive streets. Finally, the four broke through the dimensional wall together, presenting a mix and match on the center stage. coexisting works.

The four captains incarnated as "Street Fighters" and guarded their respective streets. The dancers chose one of them for a street dance show, and they were successfully promoted when they were approved by the captain. There are only 25 promotion places per street, and the promotion probability is comparable to "Battle Royale".

Episode 2 (March 3, 2018) 
More than halfway through the audition, the competition schedule is more intense, the remaining promotion places are getting fewer and fewer, and the four captains are getting better and better.

The large number of candidates for the audition and the sharp reduction in the number of promotions in the captain's hands made the players feel under pressure, and they used their killer skills one after another. Programs with different characteristics appeared one after another, such as Western hip-hop with Chinese elements.

Episode 3 (March 10, 2018) 
The audition has come to an end, and the top 100 list has been released. The top 100 entered the top 49, and a new cruel competition system was established. The four captains staged a "robbing" battle. For the first time, the four captains were in the same frame in the program at the same time, and jointly selected the top 49.

The 100-to-49 competition system is harsh. Once the top 49 are advanced, the players who do not perform after the top 49 will "die" directly. This kind of competition system caused the players with the lower serial numbers to take the initiative to call out in order to seize the opportunity to perform, and there was a fight within the team.

Episode 4 (March 17, 2018) 
In this issue, the top 49 battles will continue. More hip-hop masters appeared in the show, and the four captains announced the selection criteria for the new link and opened the "mutual confrontation" mode. Top 49 revealed.

Episode 5 (March 24, 2018) 
In this issue, the contestants are divided into 8 groups, and the 24-hour choreography will compete in pairs. The dancers, who were mostly individual battles before, are engaged in a "team battle" this time. The round-the-clock rehearsal not only challenges the dancers' physical limits, but also a great test of their psychological quality. The four captains specially came to visit the class to accompany them until late at night.

Episode 6 (March 31, 2018) 
The top 44 results of this "tiebreaker" match were announced. Then the four captains staged "36 strategies" to build their own teams. For the first time, the team assembled to perform a team show.

Episode 7 (April 7, 2018)

Episode 8 (April 14, 2018)

Episode 9 (April 21, 2018)

Episode 10 (April 28, 2018)

Episode 11 (May 5, 2018)

Episode 12 (May 13, 2018) 
The tense atmosphere of the annual festival has changed. The dancers danced together to enjoy the festival, and even the captains and players collectively refused to accept the challenge of the program group.

Choreographers 

 Keone & Mari
 Lyle Beniga
 Phillip Chbeeb
 Galen Hooks
 Jeff Phi Nguyen
 Russell Ferguson

References

Chinese web series
2018 web series debuts
Dance competition television shows
Street dance competitions
Youku original programming
2018 Chinese television series debuts
Chinese-language television shows